= Koddinou Petra =

Town of ancient Lydia

Coordinates: 38°35′08″N 27°30′13″E

Koddinou Petra was a town of ancient Lydia,situated in present-day western Turkey. It was inhabited during Roman times.Its site is located near Taş Süret in Asiatic Turkey in Manisa Province.
